Angus McDonald (July 18, 1867 – September 25, 1926) was a Canadian politician. He represented the riding of Timiskaming in the House of Commons of Canada from 1920 to 1925 after winning a by-election in 1920 and retaining his seat in the 1921 general election. His riding was abolished due to redistribution prior to the 1925 election and he did not run again.

He was an independent MP, with no party affiliation. Macdonald was a carpenter by trade.

References

1867 births
1926 deaths
Independent MPs in the Canadian House of Commons
Members of the House of Commons of Canada from Ontario